The FBW 80-N is a vehicle of the Swiss vehicle manufacturer Franz Brozincevic & Cie. It was one of the last trucks built by Franz Brozincevic Wetzikon.

In 1976, the truck was made and from 1976 to 1990 the Swiss Army used it with the M number M+81287. Another one was used until the year
2000 by the civilian Nüssli
AG. It never entered mass production, because the Army bought 72 of the dump trucks Saurer D 330 N. The only vehicle is today in the Military Museum Full. The FBW Type 80 was one of the last
designed trucks from FBW.

References

External links
  FBW 80-N 6x4 on  Militär Motorfahrer Verein St.Galleroberland Graubünden (MMV SGO/GR) 

Military trucks of Switzerland
Off-road vehicles
Abandoned military projects of Switzerland
Military vehicles introduced in the 1970s